Group B of the 2012 Fed Cup Europe/Africa Zone Group II was one of two pools in the Europe/Africa Zone Group II of the 2012 Fed Cup. Four teams competed in a round robin competition, with the top team and the bottom team proceeding to their respective sections of the play-offs: the top teams played for advancement to Group I, while the bottom team faced potential relegation to Group III.

Georgia vs. Norway

Latvia vs. Turkey

Georgia vs. Latvia

Turkey vs. Norway

Georgia vs. Turkey

Latvia vs. Norway

See also
Fed Cup structure

References

External links
 Fed Cup website

2012 Fed Cup Europe/Africa Zone